Reimei ('Dawn') is the in-flight name for a small Japanese satellite known during development as INDEX (INnovative-technology Demonstration Experiment), developed in-house at JAXA both to serve as a demonstration of small-satellite technologies (particularly high-performance and high-accuracy attitude control) and to perform simultaneous optical and charged-particle observation of the aurora. A notable feature is the 25 μm-thick polyimide mirrors used for concentrating sunlight onto the solar arrays.

The construction budget was $4 million. The satellite was launched into a near-sun-synchronous 630 km orbit on 24 August 2005 as a piggyback on the OICETS launch on the Dnepr launch vehicle.

References 

Satellites of Japan
Spacecraft launched by Dnepr rockets
Spacecraft launched in 2005